Frederik Harhoff (born 27 May 1949 in Copenhagen, Denmark) is a Danish jurist. He was a member of the faculty of the University of Copenhagen and served as an ad litem judge for the International Criminal Tribunal for the former Yugoslavia from 9 January 2007 to 28 August 2013. After acquittals of mid-level Serbian suspects in war crimes trials, Harhoff circulated a letter to colleagues stating that the higher bar for convictions in this case was established by ICTY Chief Justice Theodor Meron, and strongly hinted that Meron was acting on behalf of the U.S. and Israel in enacting the policy (Harhoff later said that he had erred in not including Russia, France and China amongst countries that would actively seek higher standards for war crimes because all three countries were involved in controversial military operations at the time). The Harhoff letter was highly controversial when it was leaked to the press, and Harhoff was disqualified from a separate war crimes trial for being set on conviction regardless of evidence, later departing the ICTY when his term of office was not renewed there.

References

1949 births
Living people
Danish jurists
People from Copenhagen
Academic staff of the University of Copenhagen
20th-century Danish people
21st-century Danish people